Malcolm John Kerr JP (born  18 April 1950), a former Australian politician, was a Member of the New South Wales Legislative Assembly representing Cronulla for the Liberal Party between 1984 and 2011. Kerr is a barrister.

References

External links
Official website
Liberal Party profile

Members of the New South Wales Legislative Assembly
Liberal Party of Australia members of the Parliament of New South Wales
Living people
1950 births
Place of birth missing (living people)
People from the Sutherland Shire
21st-century Australian politicians
Australian justices of the peace